St George's Church is the parish for the English speaking Catholics in Westboro/West Wellington Village, within the city and archdiocese of Ottawa.The parish of St George was founded in 1923, its territory carved out of St Mary's Parish. It has become the home of Ottawa's growing Eritrean Catholic community.

Msgr. George Prudhomme and Parish Life in the Early Years 

George Prudhomme was appointed the first pastor, and the name of new parish was in honour of his own patron saint. Newspaper accounts say Msgr. Prudhomme was a builder and a very sociable and popular pastor. A graduate of the University of Ottawa, where he was a star athlete, Msgr. Prudhomme came to St. George's from Our Lady of the Visitation Church in Gloucester. He later served as pastor of Blessed Sacrament Parish (1933–39) and St. Patrick’s (Basilica) Parish downtown (1939–51).

For the first months, starting on 30 September 1923, masses for the new parish community were celebrated at the Sisters of the Visitation Convent. The parish rented the convent chapel for a year until a new church was built. A special relationship was created between the parish and the nuns at the convent, who contributed handmade items to the parish for bazaars and fund-raisers. A few nuns remained at the Visitation Convent when the order recently sold the property. The convent remains as a heritage building.

The Catholic Women's League (CWL)

One of the earliest parish groups was the Catholic Women's League, which set up a Council in 1923 and was a dominant force in the parish for the remainder of the 20th century. 

Cooks' Tours were one of the social highlights of the year with parishioners visiting different houses where food from various countries was prepared and served, e.g. Irish stew, pea soup, and ice cream - Ireland, France and Canada. Judging from the menu and the number of countries represented, no one returned home hungry. With the houses located on the tour only a short distance from one another, the parishioners could easily walk the route and get some exercise between courses.

In 1929, the Catholic Women's League held a weeklong fall fair or tombola at the Hibernian Hall, next to the firehouse on Parkdale Ave. The parish netted over $5,000 for the event, a huge sum of money at the time. Later, the fair was held at the corner of Island Park Dr. and Richmond Rd., on the property of the Champlain Garage, with many attractions, including merry-go-round and Ferris wheel rides. The CWL also organized its members into groups to canvass for the Stations of the Cross, the Tabernacle and other needs of the new church.

Parish Church of St George 
The foundations of the new parish church were laid in 1923. On 21 September 1924, St George's Church was blessed, and thus officially inaugurated, by Joseph-Ménard Émard, Archbishop of Ottawa (1922-1927); however, it was not until 8 October 1998 that Marcel André J. Gervais (Archbishop of Ottawa 1989-2007) performed the rites of consecration. In 2014, a large building project was finished and the new parish hall and adjacent facilities were blessed by Archbishop Terrence Pendergast SJ.

Werner Nofke of the firm Nofke, Morin and Sylvester designed St. George's church. Mr. Nofke was a Lutheran who was the architect for a number of buildings for the Catholic Church in Ottawa. St. Theresa's Church downtown, which opened in 1929, was another of his buildings.

The Church Bell 

To anyone in the surrounding neighbourhood, the bell at St. George's is a familiar and welcome sound. In the afternoon of September 21, 1924, the bell was officially blessed. It was manufactured in Troy, New York and weighs 600 lbs. It bears the inscription: St. George's Parish, Ottawa West, Founded September 29, 1923, Rev. George Prudhomme, parish priest, Pope Pius XI, Archbishop Joseph-Médard Emard.  Following the services in the afternoon and evening, the parishioners proceeded to ring the bell and offered donations.

St. George's School 
In the early years, the parish school was located in the church basement. Over a period of time, problems mounted and parents were choosing to send their children to public schools. The school became inadequate and by 1937, a report to the Archbishop described "improper heating and lighting, extreme lavatory shortage and overcrowding". In August 1939, a new school officially opened next to the church. It cost $45,000. It was dedicated by Archbishop Guillaume Forbes. H.J. Morin, whose family belonged to St. George's, was the architect.  A few years later there was an addition built which almost doubled the size of the school. In 2002, the school moved to the former St. Joseph's intermediate school on Keyworth Ave., which was renovated for primary school students. The site of the former school was sold to a developer and now is a townhouse complex.

Parish Hall 
When the church was built in 1924, the space in the church basement was used as the parish school. There was only a small space under the front of the church for parish gatherings and the kitchen was the small room now used by the parish custodian. In June 1926, the CWL held a tea for Msgr. Prudhomme's 25th anniversary and the cramped space was filled to capacity. When the new school was built in 1939, the basement was remade as a parish hall. It was renovated again in 1968. With the renovation completed in 2013, the parish hall is a desirable and much used social venue for parish socials, fund raisers and community gatherings.

The Grey Sisters of the Immaculate Conception
The Grey Sisters taught in the basement school and every day for fifteen years, they took the streetcar from Laurier Ave. East to the Ottawa West streetcar station near the church. They came to live in the parish in 1941, residing at St. Michael's Convent, then a brick house on Piccadilly Ave., from where students were also given private piano lessons. A new convent was built in 1961. In the early 2000s, the Grey Sisters sold the building to a non-profit group.

The St. Vincent de Paul Society
Founded in France in 1833, the Society is a large, international organization, with branches in Ottawa. Its members interview the needy and help with relief of the destitute and poor. Food vouchers are given to the needy and paid through the St. Vincent de Paul fund, established through several annual Sunday collections. Recipients are generally within the parish boundaries but not necessarily parish members. No one in need is refused help. The West Ottawa Council of the Society of Saint Vincent de Paul was established in 1925. St. Vincent de Paul Central Store works with agencies like the Children's Aid Society, Catholic Immigration Services, the Elizabeth Fry Society, the John Howard Society, The Shepherds of Good Hope, local food banks, and numerous denominational and inter-faith groups.

Parish Territory 

The location for St George's church was chosen because of the streetcar that used to run alongside Byron Avenue. The area was one of the streetcar suburbs, now close to the core area of Ottawa, which attracted new residents who commuted to work using the streetcar system that began operation in the 1890s. When the church opened in 1924, it was only a short walk from the streetcar line at the Ottawa West station. This handy location meant that many families were able to ride the streetcar directly to church. Today, the streetcar corridor is the well-used recreational pathway lying just beyond the church.

St. George's filled a huge void between St. Mary's Church on Bayswater Ave. and a small chapel in Britannia. In fact, the boundaries of the parish extended from Holland Ave. to Britannia in the west and from the Ottawa River to Manotick in the south. A census of the area reported some 160 English-Catholic families and about 111 French-speaking families. St. Joan of Arc parish, near Churchill Ave. and Byron Ave. was also established in 1923 to serve the French-speaking residents of the district. (A number of years ago, St. Joan of Arc became Our Lady of LaVang parish, serving the Vietnamese community.) At present, the parish territory extends between Broadview Avenue in the west, Caroline/Harmer Avenues in the east, and Carling/Dovercourt/Avondale Avenues in the south; the northern boundary of the parish is the Ottawa River.

War Years (1939-45) 
Many parishioners served for Canada in World War II (1939–45). As with other Ottawa parishes, the war took its toll. Some of the young men from our parish who died in the conflict: Tom Farrell and Ray Casey on Granville Ave., Lawrence Moher on Kenora St., George Robinson on Mulvihill Ave.

Father Michael O'Neill (1933-51) oversees a tremendous growth in the parish while fighting illness
Father Michael O'Neill, from Eganville, Renfrew County, was appointed to succeed Msgr. Prudhomme in 1933. Father O'Neill oversaw the building of a new parish school in 1939 and during the years of World War II from 1939 to 1945, he was called upon to console the families of victims of the war. Father O'Neill suffered from a severe illness and had to delegate many of his responsibilities during the last several years of his life. Throughout the 1940s, Fr. Murray was the Curate who capably took over the parish, and was later joined by the newly ordained Fr. Francis French. With over 600 families and a 600+ student school to minister to, it was a heavy workload.  Fr. O'Neill remained the parish priest until his death in 1951. During these years St. George's experienced tremendous growth. Following his funeral mass at St. George's, his remains were interred in St. James parish cemetery, Eganville, his home town. The headstone inscription says that the stone was donated by the parishioners of St. George's Church in Ottawa.

Marian Congress in Ottawa (1947) 
Msgr. John O'Neill, who served as the first assistant to Msgr. Prudhomme, was the prime organizer of the Congress. Its purpose was to celebrate the centenary of the Archdiocese of Ottawa and to pray for lasting peace in the world. Although now largely forgotten, in its day it was the largest religious conference in North America. Ottawa had never seen anything like it. At St George's Church, Msgr. O'Neill delivered the first of a series of sermons on the Marian Congress, which he gave in every parish in Ottawa. The Marian Congress was held from June 18 to 22, 1947.  Msgr. O'Neill urged the parishioners to prepare accommodation for the thousands of visitors coming from all parts of North America to witness this week of prayer. A huge outdoor site was built at Lansdowne Park for the religious spectacular, which was attended by Cardinal Mindzenty who for several years had sought refuge in the American Embassy in Hungary and was recently released to freedom. In front were benches enough to seat 75,000 people. There were also 110 exhibits on the site. Estimates of attendance vary from 100,000 to 250,000. Many were locals but visitors arrived by car, bus, plane, and 66 special excursion trains.

During the five-day Congress there was a procession of floats along the canal driveway. The Congress also featured the Dionne Quintuplets (age 13) singing hymns in both English and French.  The event ended with an event called “the greatest fireworks display ever held in Canada” depicting scenes in the life of the Blessed Virgin. A message to the Congress from Pope Pius XII was broadcast during a Mass on June 19 and carried by major radio networks across the country.  The Congress was attended by nine cardinals.

25th Anniversary of St. George's  (1948) 
The number of families increased from 160 in 1923 to 1,000 by 1948, the year of the parish's 25th anniversary. To commemorate the occasion, mass was celebrated by Ottawa's Archbishop Alexandre Vachon assisted by the former pastor, Msgr. George Prudhomme, then pastor of St. Patrick's Church in downtown Ottawa. The Archbishop paid tribute to the pastor, Father O'Neil, who had greatly reduced the parish debt while overseeing the expansion of the parish and the building of a new school.

Msgr. Ernest Bambrick (1951-1967) presides over an active and mature parish 
Msgr. Ernest Bambrick was raised in St. Brigid's parish in the Lowertown neighbourhood of Ottawa and served there in the 1920s as a curate. He was pastor at St. Michael's in Fitzroy Harbour where he oversaw a large church renovation. Msgr. Bambrick was a tough boss who left his imprint on the parish. One story is that while at St. Brigid's, an anti-Catholic fanatic was angered enough to try to run him down. The young Father Bambrick suffered an injury that took several months for him to recover.  At St. George's, he oversaw the building of a new convent and the continued expansion of the parish. During the mid-20th century, the parish was very much part of the social life of Catholics in the neighbourhood. St. George’s had an adult bowling league and a huge youth group called ‘The Solidarity’. Amateur plays were produced on the large stage that existed in the hall until the major church renovations of 1968. This was also the site of many school Christmas concerts.  Msgr. Bambrick retired in 1967 and died two years later in April, 1969. He was interred in a family plot at Notre Dame Cemetery.

Passing of Msgr. Prudhomme (1958) 
The death of Msgr. George Prudhomme, aged 87, occurred in 1958 at St. Patrick's Church rectory. A native of Cantley, Quebec, 20 kilometres north of Ottawa, he is buried there in the parish cemetery of St. Elizabeth's Church.

New Convent (1961) 
In 1961, a new convent was built by the Grey Sisters. After residing in a house on Piccadilly Ave. since 1941, the new convent provided larger and more adequate quarters for the sisters.

Ordination of Brendan O'Brien (1968) 
The ordination of Archbishop Brendan O'Brien, later Archbishop of St. John’s and Kingston, took place at St. George's Church on June 1, 1968. The son of Margaret and Redmond O'Brien, Archbishop O'Brien grew up in the parish and attended St. George's School. The ordination was conducted by Ottawa Archbishop Joseph-Aurèle Plourde. Archbishop O'Brien has served as Ottawa's auxiliary bishop, Bishop of Pembroke, Archbishop of St. John's and Archbishop of Kingston.

The Queensway Social Action Group 

The Queensway Social Action group was started in 1969 with the participation of seven parishes, including St. George's.  The other churches were Holy Rosary, St. Stephen's Presbyterian, St. Matthias Anglican, and Parkdale United. Its initial program was a head start program, and expanded to include senior citizens, a mothers' program and school breakfast program.

Cambodian Refugee Family

In 1979, following the announcement of Project 4000, Msgr. John MacDonald committed the parish to sponsoring a refugee family and asked Frank McAlpine to chair a parish refugee committee. Numerous parishioners were part of the refugee effort, which began in July, 1979 and ended in December, 1980.  Some $20,000 was raised in the parish with several groups divided according to tasks, i.e. clothing, food, furniture, recreation, housing, medical needs. The refugee family consisted of two parents and four children.  When the sponsorship ended, there was a surplus in the budget, which was directed towards another refugee family.

Msgr. John MacDonald (1967-85) directs the parish through the post-Vatican II period 
Msgr. John MacDonald was Vicar-General under Archbishop Plourde and the founding pastor of Mount Carmel parish where he oversaw the building of the new church. 

Msgr. MacDonald arrived at St. George's in the wake of Vatican II and renovated the church to reflect the new liturgical standards. He established a parish council, surveyed parishioners on the changes introduced following the Vatican Council and oversaw outreach to neighbourhood churches. Recognizing the needs of elderly parishioners, he arranged for the building of a hydraulic elevator, one of the first church elevators in the city. He set out to revive the tennis club and invited Victor Hossack, the former president of the Ottawa Lawn Tennis Association, to become the club pro and offer lessons to aspiring tennis players. 

In 1973, the parish celebrated its 50th anniversary with a weeklong celebration. At that point in the church's development, Msgr. MacDonald paid tribute to the early parishioners who had experienced and overcome great challenges. He also expressed his gratitude to the neighbourhood, including other denominations for their support. During his tenure, the financial base of the parish was sound and the mortgage was paid off.

Under Msgr. MacDonald, the parish participated with other churches in the neighbourhood to establish the Queensway social action group and also sponsored a Cambodian refugee family under the City of Ottawa's Project 4000, an endeavour to rescue the 'boat people' fleeing Southeast Asia. Msgr. MacDonald retired in November, 1985 and died in February 1986.  The brother of Father Donald MacDonald, he is buried with him and other family members in a plot at Notre Dame Cemetery.

Msgr. Gerald Donegan - Curate (1950-61) and Pastor (1985-95) 
Msgr. Gerald Donegan was ordained a priest in 1950 and served as a curate at St. George's until 1961. During this period, he forged a strong association with the youth of the parish. He was also the spiritual director of the Catholic Women’s League. In 1961, he was appointed pastor of Saint Elizabeth's in Cantley. When he returned to the parish as pastor, many parishioners had fond memories of his time at St. George's, almost 25 years earlier. Such was his popularity that his appointment also resulted in a surge of attendance from parishioners of other churches.

One of his first initiatives as pastor was the construction of a link between the church and rectory. A longtime chaplain of the Ottawa police, Msgr. Donegan undertook the police prayer campaign where individual parishioners were matched with a police officer. He also instituted an annual Lenten project in aid of Mother Teresa’s worldwide charities. This activity raised over 113 thousand dollars by 1993. As pastor, Msgr. Donegan resumed his position as director of the CWL, which he held previously from 1950 to 1961. During his time as pastor, a number of highly successful dances raised money for organizations such as the Heart Institute and the Ottawa Police. Father Michael Gillissie, a vocation from the parish, was ordained in 1987 and became an assistant to Msgr. Donegan.

In 2000, Msgr. Gerald Donegan returned to the parish for the 50th anniversary of his ordination. Msgr. Donegan died in 2007. He laid in state at St. Patrick's Basilica downtown, his original home parish.  His funeral mass was also held there. He is interred in a family plot at Notre Dame Cemetery with his parents Ann and Benedict Donegan.

Transition period for the Parish and Neighbourhood
At the turn of the 20th century, major changes were underway, with the sale of St. George's School property as well as St. Michael's Convent, which was occupied by the Grey Sisters. The section of land near Bassett Lane where the tennis courts were located was also sold. With the exception of the convent building, church and rectory, the city block bounded by Wellington St., Bassett Lane, Mayfair and Piccadilly Avenue, was rebuilt with condominiums and townhouses. In fact, much of the surrounding neighbourhood was under pressure from high density development. While this was happening, church attendance and revenue were declining as older parishioners died or moved out of the neighbourhood.

Msgr. Robert Latour, pastor (1995-2005)

With the departure of Msgr. Donegan in 1995, there was a need to improve the financial management and administration of the parish. There was no budgeting process and no regular audit. Msgr. Robert Latour, former pastor at St. Augustine's and Our Lady of Fatima parishes, worked effectively with the lay leadership to tighten administrative and financial procedures and to allow parishioners to assume greater responsibility. A regular secretary was hired and new finance and pastoral councils began a budget process, regulated the use of the parish hall and established a smoother, more transparent administration. Msgr. Latour also worked with the liturgy committee to promote participation and training for the laity. A parish library was established. 

In the 1997 capital campaign for the 150th anniversary of the archdiocese, the parish raised some $351,000. In that same year, Fr Latour was awarded the honorific title of Prelate of Honour. In 1998, the parish marked its 75th anniversary with Bishop Brendan O'Brien returning for a St. George's Day mass on April 23; there was a Memories Evening with older parishioners sharing their stories; there was a mass and social to honour longtime parishioners; the final event was the consecration of the Church by Archbishop Marcel Gervais, followed by a banquet. Msgr. Latour supported the Knights of Columbus in setting up a new Council at St. George's. Msgr. Latour is currently in residence at Notre Dame Basilica Cathedral.

Father Leonard St. John, pastor (2005-2013)
Father Leonard St. John, former pastor of St. Peter Celestine parish in Pakenham, was appointed pastor in 2005. Father St. John and the newly appointed parish manager, Georges Bouliane, opened the way for a major renovation and addition to the church. He also supported the Parish Finance and Pastoral Councils in attempting to strengthen the financial base of the parish by increasing envelope donations and establishing a legacy fund for the church building fund. Major improvements to the church would result in improved kitchen and washroom facilities and more space for library, meeting rooms and storage. Rental income from local organizations would raise revenue for the church. A lengthy period of planning and consultations followed with the parish and Archdiocese of Ottawa. In 2012-13, the existing basement underwent a major renovation and a new south side addition to the church was built. During this period, Father St. John was affected by some health problems but was able to remain as pastor until the project was finished, retiring in 2013. Father St. John returns now and then to the parish for liturgies and parish socials.

Msgr. Hans Feichtinger (2013–) 

With the retirement of Father St. John in 2013, Msgr. Hans Feichtinger was appointed parish administrator; since 2017 he also is administrator of the German-speaking parish St. Albertus. He has given greater attention to Catholic tradition and liturgical standards. A former official at the Vatican, his homilies are strongly rooted in Catholic theology. Msgr. Feichtinger has raised devotion to the patron saint, building a shrine to St. George in the new church extension and using an image of St. George as the parish logo.

Msgr. Feichtinger has raised the profile of the parish on social media. Music in the liturgy has become a key aspect of parish life: There is more traditional chant and polyphony on Sunday morning at 9 am, using liturgical reforms aimed at restoring a greater use of Latin and Gregorian chant. At 10.30, there is high quality Praise and Worship. There has been more attention to Catholic devotions with regular Benediction and Adoration of the Blessed Sacrament. There was a minor but significant re-design of the church interior, moving the tabernacle and crucifix to a more prominent position in the centre of the sanctuary, bringing back a statue and altar of Our Lady, enlarging the sanctuary space, removing the carpet from the nave, and installing a state-of-the-art sound system.

His main administrative task was to deal with declining attendance from the neighbourhood and the $1.5 million debt following the major renovation. The strategy to deal with these challenges is to refocus the mission of parish. following the newly formulation mission statement:

"St. George’s Parish is a community of Roman Catholic believers, 

consciously living our call to be disciples of Jesus, our Lord and Saviour. 

As we CONNECT, LEARN, PRAY, and SERVE, we bear witness to the living Christ."

On this basis, the goal is to promote a stronger Catholic culture in the parish, to increase the profile of St. George's, to build opportunities of evangelization and faith development, and to foster community through social events and a new attention to stewardship (rather than relying on classical fund raising methods. Since 2018, Chesterton Academy of Ottawa has opened at St George's. The presence of its students at morning Mass has significantly improved daily liturgies.

Parish life and Catholic Associations 
The Catholic Women's League began a CWL council at St. George's in 1923, which ceased to function in 1998; its records document parish life. The Knights of Columbus set up a council that continued to support parish life, social events, and parish fund-raising. 

Together with the church, St George Catholic School opened in 1923. For the first years, the school used the church basement for classrooms. Later, a large school building was constructed next to the church, between Piccadilly and Mayfair Avenues. This building no longer exists. At present, St George School is using a building further north, formerly known as St Joseph's Middle School.
St George's hosts Alpha sessions, some of them specially geared towards parents of children preparing for first sacraments. In the recent past, there was a group of the Catechesis of the Good Shepherd, and regular CCO Faith Studies for (young) adults. St George's Social Justice Committee assists refugees from Eritrea and the Middle East. The parish offers spaces for non-profit groups and social events in the newly renovated St George's Parish Hall. For over ten years, a number of student priests have been living at St George's Rectory while pursuing graduate studies at Saint Paul University or at Dominican University College. With their part-time ministry, these priests offer a valuable contribution to the life of the parish. One of them is Prosper Balthazar Lyimo, Auxiliary Bishop in the Archdiocese of Arusha, Tanzania

The Church of the Annunciation of the Blessed Virgin Mary, which belongs to the Personal Ordinariate of the Chair of Saint Peter, is located on the territory of St George's Parish. The two Catholic communities work together in various ways and join for a grand eucharistic procession every year for the feast of Corpus Christi. In 2016, Archbishop Luigi Bonazzi, Apostolic Nuncio in Canada, was the main celebrant of the Mass and Procession on Corpus Christi, in 2017 Bishop Steven Lopes, head of the Personal Ordinariate of the Chair of St Peter.

Vocations from the Parish
St George's is the native parish of Brendan O'Brien (Archbishop of Kingston). In addition to him, St. George's has been honoured by a number of other vocations to the priesthood: Msgr. Paul Baxter, Rev. Michael Gillissie, and Rev. Tom Farrell; Oblate vocations include Rev. Jack McCann, Rev. Thomas Cassidy, Rev. James Noonan, and Rev. John Massell.

Parish Socials and Traditions, and Knights of Columbus 

For the feast of Corpus Christi, St George Parish, the Church of the Annunciation of the Blessed Virgin Mary,  and St Albertus Pfarrgemeinde come together for a solemn Mass and eucharistic procession through the neighborhood.  During the year, the parish, often with the help of the Knights of Columbus, host a number of events: Oktoberfest, St Patrick's Day, St Nicholas Day, etc. - The Knights of Columbus' Council became established in 1998. Possibly the longest-running tradition in the parish is the Strawberry Social: this event, held at the end of June, was started by the Catholic Women's League, probably in the 1920s. Now, members of the parish keep it going. Every year, rain or shine, it is held in the parish hall with fresh, local strawberries.

References 

A Brief History and Parishes of the Archdiocese of Ottawa, 

School Histories: St George Catholic School http://www.theinquiry.ca/wordpress/wp-content/uploads/2011/04/McCann-St-Georges-RC-School-Ottawa.pdf

External links 
 Website

Roman Catholic Ecclesiastical Province of Ottawa